Smt. Shanti Devi College of Management & Technology is situated in the village of Saharanwas, Rewari district, India. It is affiliated with Maharshi Dayanand University at Rohtak.

References

Business schools in Haryana
Universities and colleges in Haryana
Rewari district